Bati language  may refer to:

Bati language (Indonesia)
Bati language (Cameroon)
Bati (Ti) dialect of the Nga'ka language (Cameroon)
Bati (Baati) dialect of the Bwa language (DR Congo)